Nafiza Azad is a Fijian-Canadian young adult fiction fantasy author. Her debut novel, The Candle and the Flame, was released in 2019.

Early life and education 
Azad was born in Lautoka, Fiji. Opportunities to access reading materials were limited: her hometown only contained one library, and readers could only borrow two books at a time, so Azad and her friends often made up stories for entertainment. In 2001, aged seventeen, she moved to Canada with her family. Azad entered the University of British Columbia in 2007, initially majoring in biology with the aim of becoming a doctor. However, she later elected to major in English instead, and to aspire to a career in writing. Her thesis consisted of a novel, which she claims to have written after a professor told her not to. Her thesis advisor was Maggie de Vries. Azad currently lives in Vancouver.

Career 
Azad's first work, The Candle and the Flame, was published by Scholastic in 2019. She credits American author G. Willow Wilson- who, like her, is both female and Muslim- as a major influence on her decision to pursue a writing career, stating that reading Wilson’s novel Alif the Unseen made her feel “as though I had finally found a reflection […] I had a right to my own adventures”, subsequently inspiring her to write fiction of her own. Additionally, she cites S.A. Chakraborty's novel The City of Brass and Franny Billingsley's Chime as influences on the plot and writing style of The Candle and the Flame. As an author, she is represented by Katelyn Detwailer at Jill Grinberg Literary Management.

She is currently a co-founder of, and writer and administrator at Book Wars.

Works

The Candle and the Flame (2019) 
The Candle and the Flame is Azad’s debut novel. It was first published on March 1, 2019 by Scholastic Press, an imprint of Scholastic Inc. 

The novel is set in the fictional Silk Road city of Noor, in which humans and Djinn- supernatural spirits from Islamic folklore- live side by side. Its plot follows a young woman named Fatima, who is one of the sole survivors of a massacre that wiped out the city’s original population, and who becomes entangled in the conflict between its human inhabitants, the Ifrit (a class of Djinn) and evil spirits known as the Shayateen. The city is inspired by and contains elements of South Asian and Middle Eastern cultures, with the novel containing words in Arabic, Punjabi, Urdu and Hindi.

Azad has stated that she wrote The Candle and the Flame as a response to the increasing prevalence of nationalism and anti-immigrant prejudices, and to show readers the value of multiculturalism and diversity. She believes that ‘the spirit of diversity and multiculturalism is vital to children’s literature’, because it allows children and young people from a variety of backgrounds to see themselves reflected in the stories that they access, as well as giving them a chance to learn about and relate to groups that they do not belong to. In an interview with author Hafsah Faizal, Azad says 'I was very tired of the hostility constantly directed our way, so I decided on a Muslim protagonist'. Additionally, she has claimed that the book reflects her feminist beliefs, stating that it 'is mostly about women being women in the most fantastic ways possible', and that through it she hopes to demonstrate to readers 'that women can be strong in various ways without needing to pick up a sword'.

Reception for the novel was generally favourable. Caitlyn Paxson, writing for NPR, praised Azad's capacity for worldbuilding, noting in particular the novel's 'attention to detail and dedication to language'. Booklist's Amna Maque, meanwhile, described The Candle and the Flame as a 'splendid debut' with 'immersive writing' and 'an emotionally complex cast'. Both critics, however, noted that the novel's pacing was inconsistent, with Paxson writing that 'In particular, the first half takes a while to find its way, with the second picking up speed.' 

Author Rena Barron noted the novel's 'lush, elaborate world-building', stating that it was 'a must-read for people who love fantasy brimming with beautiful writing and mythology'; it was also praised by other authors of Young Adult and genre fiction including Rachel Hartman, Rebecca Lim and Ausma Zehanat Khan.

The Wild Ones (2021) 
The rights to Azad's second Young Adult novel, The Wild Ones: A Broken Anthem for a Girl Nation, were acquired by Margaret K. McElderry Books, an imprint of Simon and Schuster's Children's Division, in March 2020. Following a group of young girls with magical abilities in a narrative with multiple perspectives and feminist themes, the novel is expected to be published in the summer of 2021.

Accolades 
Azad has received nominations for the following awards:

 2020
William C. Morris YA Debut Award for The Candle and the Flame (finalist).
 Sunburst Award for Excellence in Canadian Literature of the Fantastic for The Candle and the Flame (long-listed).

References

External links 

 

21st-century Fijian writers
21st-century Canadian women writers
Canadian women novelists
Fijian women writers
Canadian fantasy writers
Year of birth missing (living people)
Living people